James D. Davison (born 28 August 1986) is an Australian professional racing driver who drives an Aston Martin Vantage GT3 in the Blancpain GT World Challenge America. He has also competed in the NTT IndyCar Series, NASCAR Cup Series, and NASCAR Xfinity Series. He is sometimes also called JD (or J. D.) Davison.

His father Jon Davison was a Formula 5000 competitor and was the long-running promoter of racing events at Sandown Raceway. Davison's grandfather, Lex Davison, was a four-time winner of the Australian Grand Prix. He is a cousin of V8 Supercar drivers Alex and Will Davison. He also competed as a coxswain as part of Scotch College's championship-winning rowing crew in 2003.

Racing career

Open-wheel

Junior formula
In 2004 he joined the ranks of Formula Ford in his native Australia, running in both the Victorian and National Championships. At the end of 2004 he won a scholarship at the BMW Junior Scholarship Finals in Valencia. For 2005 Davison competed in the Formula BMW USA Junior Series, qualifying on the front row at the Canadian Formula 1 Grand Prix in Montreal, won at the US Grand Prix held at the world-famous Indianapolis Motor Speedway, was second at the Denver street circuit and Mid-Ohio and third at Barber Motorsports Park and Road Atlanta. Based on these performances, Davison became part of the Confederation of Australian Motorsport Elite Driver program which included attendance at the Australian Institute of Sport and financial support from the Foundation. At the end of the season, he qualified and finished tenth at the Formula BMW Final at Bahrain.

2006 saw him again compete in the United States in the Formula Atlantic series for Team Australia. After the Denver round, he was dropped by the team for fellow Aussie Michael Patrizi. 2007 saw Davison progress into the Star Mazda Championship where current IndyCar Series drivers Marco Andretti and Graham Rahal previously competed. Driving for Velocity Motorsports, Davison proved to be an outstanding competitor finishing second in the Championship; earning three pole positions and one win.

Indy Lights
2008 found him in the Firestone Indy Lights series, racing for Sam Schmidt Motorsports. He struggled throughout the first half of the season, but captured his first series pole at Nashville Superspeedway, a concrete oval, in July. His first win came in bizarre circumstances in a wet race at Mid-Ohio.  While running second on the last lap, race leader Jonny Reid went into pit lane instead of the finish line, handing Davison the victory. Davison also received the Sunoco Most Improved Driver Award at the IRL Championship Celebration held in Las Vegas. Davison finished second in the 2009 Firestone Indy Lights Championship with a new team Vision Racing, again winning at Mid-Ohio. Davison was running at the finish of all fifteen races and finished in the top ten in all but one.

IndyCar

In November 2011 he tested for Andretti Autosport at Palm Beach International Raceway, Florida. He shared the car with Indy Lights driver Gustavo Yacaman.

In 2013 Davison tested a car for Dale Coyne Racing at the Mid-Ohio Sports Car Course. A few weeks later it was announced that he would drive the team's No. 18 car at the race there. It would be his first open wheel race appearance since 2009. Following the horrific accident by Sebastian Bourdais during qualifying for the 2017 Indianapolis 500, it was announced that James would be stepping into the number 18 Dale Coyne Racing Honda for the remainder of the season. In the later stages of the race, Davison matched a record set by Tom Sneva in 1980 and became the third driver in Indy history to start 33rd and lead laps in the race, having led two laps. He then got caught up in a late wreck with 17 laps to go. A year later, Davison barely qualified for the 2018 Indianapolis 500, bumping out longtime IndyCar rival James Hinchcliffe. He would finish in last place, after a crash on lap 47 caused by contact with Takuma Sato's car. Davison finished in last place again at the 2020 Indianapolis 500 due to a mechanical failure only six laps into the race.

Historic racing
In 2011 he drove his Uncle Richard Davison's Lola T332 Formula 5000 car at Phillip Island and Albert Park. In 2012, he returned to drive it again at Phillip Island. In 2019 he drove a Lotus 18 at Goodwood and Lotus 81 at Silverstone. 
In 2022, he drove a Hill GH1 at the 13th Historic Monaco. Then drove again at Spa in September.

Sports car racing
2010 saw him make his sportscar debut in the Grand-Am Series for Starworks Motorsports Corsa Car Care Dinan-BMW Riley partnering Ryan Dalziel and Mike Forest in the Sahlen's Six Hours of The Glen finishing seventh. He was then drafted in to run at the 6 Hours of Watkins Glen the Crown Royal 200 also at Watkins Glen. In 2011 he drove for Michael Shank Racing at Laguna Seca.

Driving with The Racer's Group in an Aston Martin in 2014, he scored four consecutive GTD class poles across the final races of the 2014 and first race of the 2015 season.

In 2015 he joined Nismo factory team to drive a Nissan GT-R in the Pirelli World Challenge. He continued with Always Evolving Racing in the GT-R in 2016 before moving to The Racer's Group for the 2017 season.

NASCAR
Davison made his first NASCAR start in 2016, driving the No. 90 King Autosport car in the Xfinity Series for the Road America 180. He started 18th and went down one position after making contact with Scott Heckert on the last lap.

In 2020, Davison raced in the Cup Series for the first time in the Pocono Organics 325 at Pocono Raceway with Spire Motorsports. His Cup debut had been delayed on two occasions earlier in the season, with a Daytona 500 start for Jonathan Byrd's Racing ultimately failing to materalise, while his GEICO 500 entry at Talladega Superspeedway with Spire was disallowed due to his lack of experience on such tracks. He returned to the series at Loudon with Rick Ware Racing.

Davison committed to an approximately 26-race schedule with RWR for the 2021 Cup season. In May, he dominated the eNASCAR iRacing Pro Invitational Series race at Circuit of the Americas, leading 32 of 33 laps and finished 12 seconds ahead of Anthony Alfredo. He continued his dominance in the series at the virtually-designed Chicago Street Course, capturing the pole, leading every lap, and winning by 56 seconds over his Rick Ware Racing teammate Josh Bilicki. He also raced at the 2021 YellaWood 500 for the No. 66 MBM Motorsports Ford with sponsorship from Rich Mar Florist.

Motorsports career results

American open-wheel racing results
(key)

Champ Car Atlantic results

Star Mazda Championship

Indy Lights results

IndyCar Series

Indianapolis 500

Sports car racing results
(key)

Rolex Sports Car Series

IMSA SportsCar Championship

Pirelli World Challenge

NASCAR
(key) (Bold – Pole position awarded by qualifying time. Italics – Pole position earned by points standings or practice time. * – Most laps led.)

Cup Series

Xfinity Series

 Season still in progress
 Ineligible for series points

Complete S5000 results

References

External links

 
 
 Profile on Driver Database
 Profile on Speedsport
 Indy Lights Profile
 2006 Atlantic standings 
 2007 Star Mazda review 
 Grand-Am Profile

1986 births
Living people
Racing drivers from Melbourne
Formula Ford drivers
Formula BMW USA drivers
Atlantic Championship drivers
Indy Pro 2000 Championship drivers
Indy Lights drivers
Rolex Sports Car Series drivers
Australian IndyCar Series drivers
24 Hours of Daytona drivers
WeatherTech SportsCar Championship drivers
Indianapolis 500 drivers
NASCAR drivers
Joe Gibbs Racing drivers
USAC Silver Crown Series drivers
Team Meritus drivers
Walker Racing drivers
Arrow McLaren SP drivers
Vision Racing drivers
Starworks Motorsport drivers
Meyer Shank Racing drivers
Dale Coyne Racing drivers
KV Racing Technology drivers
Belardi Auto Racing drivers
A. J. Foyt Enterprises drivers